Frédéric Frans (born 3 January 1989) is a Belgian professional football player who plays as a defender for Beerschot. He spent eight years with Lierse until his move to Scottish Premiership side Partick Thistle in 2014. After two years at the Glasgow club, Frans returned to Lierse in June 2016. He then returned to Scottish football in 2018, signing for Dundee United. He left the club in 2019 and returned to Belgium following the collapse of the original Lierse. He then signed for Beerschot in the Belgian First Division B. Frans has also represented Belgium at youth level.

Club career

Lierse S.K.
Frans first joined Lierse at age six when he was spotted by Lierse's scout whilst playing for Olympia Wespelaar. Frans had progress throughout the youth team and soon under the management of Kjetil Rekdal, Frans was given a debut, coming on as a substitute for Yoni Buyens in the 90th minute, in a 3–0 loss against Genk on 27 January 2007. Shortly after, Frans signed his first professional contract with the club when he was 17. Frans went on to make thirteen appearances for the club in his second half of the season, though it saw Lierse relegated to the Second Division.

Frans then scored his first goal for the club, in a 2–1 loss against Charleroi on 1 March 2008. Frans went on to make twenty-three appearances in his first full season at Lierse. The next season saw Frans score three goals against VW Hamme in the opening game of the season and also another against them on 27 December 2008; and Eupen in his twenty-three appearances. The 2009–10 season saw things going good for Lierse, as Frans helped the club win the second division. Frans was soon appointed as the new captain of Lierse under the management of Eric Van Meir.

However the 2010–11 season didn't go well for Frans after he injured his knee that kept him out throughout the season, which he made eleven appearances. Weeks before the injury, Frans was involved in an incident that got him sent-off against Club Brugge on 13 November 2010 and eventually, his sending off was rescinded. At the end of the 2010–11 season, Frans signed a three-year contract with Lierse, keeping him until 2014.

In the 2011–12 season, Frans made his first appearance of the season since recovering from his injury, in a 2–1 loss against Mechelen on 14 August 2011. Frans was then sent-off in a 4–0 loss against Anderlecht on 30 October 2011 and this saw him receive a one match ban, as well as, being fined for 100 euro. He then scored his first goal, in a 2–2 draw against Kortrijk on 17 December 2011. Frans was largely used in the first team, as he made thirteen appearances.

In the 2012–13 season, Frans sustained a knee injury in training that caused him to miss the start of the season. After being sidelined for a month, Frans made his first appearance of the season, in a 2–0 loss against Mechelen on 16 February 2013. From that point, Frans went on to make nine appearances for the rest of the season.

In 2013–14 season, Frans was once again on the sideline at the start of the season and made his first appearance of the season, in a 1–0 loss against Lokeren on 30 October 2013. Two months later, on 26 December 2013, Frans was sent-off, in a 3–0 win over Mechelen and after this, the club appealed against his suspension. As a result, Frans' suspension was reduced to one game, though he was fined 300 euro. After making five appearances, Frans was released by the club, ending his nineteen years association with the club. Frans later revealed he was offered a three-year contract with the club, but turned it down, due to the current situation with the club's ownership.

During his career at Lierse, Frans revealed he's good friends with Charlie Miller.

Partick Thistle
He joined the club in October 2014 on a three-month contract, having been out of contract at his previous club, Lierse, earlier in the year. Frans revealed that he was all set to join Leeds United, but the move fell through after the club sacked Dave Hockaday and find then club's owner Massimo Cellino strange the way he ran the club. Frans also stated that after leaving Lierse, he was keen to play abroad.

Frans made his debut for the club in a 0–0 draw against St Johnstone in the Scottish Premiership. On 15 December 2014, Frans agreed an extension to his contract, keeping him at the club until 2016. Frans then scored his first goal for the Jags in 2–2 draw away to Kilmarnock on 24 January 2015. Frans then scored his second goal for the club in a 2–1 win over Ross County. Frans collected the ball and unleashed a 30-yard shot past the keeper into the net. In his first season at Partick Thistle, Frans made twenty-two appearances and scored two times in all competitions.

Dundee United
After two seasons back at Lierse, Frans signed for Scottish Championship club Dundee United in June 2018. On 2 September 2019, Dundee United announced that Frans had left the club, having made 25 appearances and scoring two goals while with the club.

International career
Frans has represented Belgium at various youth levels, from under 18 to under 20.

Personal life
Frans got married in 2013.

References

External links
 
 

1989 births
Living people
Belgian footballers
Belgian Pro League players
Challenger Pro League players
Scottish Professional Football League players
Lierse S.K. players
Partick Thistle F.C. players
Dundee United F.C. players
K Beerschot VA players
Belgian expatriate footballers
Expatriate footballers in Scotland
Association football defenders
Belgium youth international footballers